= Card deck =

Card deck may refer to:

- Card deck (gaming), a set of playing cards
- Card deck (computing), a set of punched cards
